Stabswachtmeister (short: StWm) is in the Austrian Bundesheer a NCO-rank. As lowest grade of the Staff-NCO rank group he is normally dedicated to command a platoon or to serve in a military staff appointment (assignment group M BUO 1 / professional NCO; respectively M ZUO 1 / longer-serving volunteer). However, he might also be assigned to command a military squad (assignment group M BUO 2 / longer-serving volunteer).

During United Nations missions and in NATO Partnership for Peace the rank Stabswachtmeister will be designated in English with Staff Sergeant (SSG) and is equivalent to NATO-Rang code OR-7.

Besides Austria today, the rank was also used for example in Germany and in the k.u.k. Army.

With the foundation of the Austrian Bundesheer in March 1920 the «Stabswachtmeister» was introduced to all army branches of service. The OR7-rank Stabsfeldwebel of the generic infantry (de: Fußtruppen) was abolished.

See also

k.u.k. Austro-Hungarian Army 

The Stabswachtmeister rank was introduced in 1913 to the cavalry of the k.u.k. Army. As well as the Offiziersstellvertreter (en: officer deputy rank), this rank has been counted to the higher NCO-ranks (also: Unteroffiziere with port épée / port épée NCOs) since 1915. According to the Austria-Hungarian rank table it was equivalent to the rank class XII. However, according to the modern days NATO-Rang code system, it might have been comparable to NCO-rank OR6/ 1st sergeant ranks in Anglophone armed forces.

In the k.u.k. Austro-Hungarian Army Stabswachtmeister was equivalent to:
Stabsfeldwebel (en: 1st sergeant) of the infantry, 
Stabsoberjäger (en: Rifles 1st sergeant) of the mountain troops, 
Stabsfeuerwerker (en: Artillery 1st sergeant) of the artillery,

Then rank insignia was a gorget patch on the stand-up collar of the so-called Waffenrock (en: uniform jacket), and consisted of three white stars on 13 mm ragged imperial-yellow silk galloon, with 2mm broad black middle strap, 3mm above a 6mm braiding (since June 1914: silver galloon with silk stars). The gorget patch and the stand-up collar showed the particular Waffenfarbe (en: corps colour).

Stabswachtmeister in k.u.k adjustation

 see also

Germany 
In the today's German Bundeswehr there is no rank designation «Stabswachtmeister». However, the equivalent to that OR-7 rank would be Hauptfeldwebel OR7.

In the German Reichswehr as well as Wehrmacht the designation of the OR7-Stabsfeldwebel rank of Cavalry and Artillery was «Stabswachtmeister» until 1945.

«Stabswachtmeister» was also a German police rank.

 See also 
 World War II German Army ranks and insignia

Nationale People’s Army 
In the GDR National People's Army (NPA) the OR7-rank «Stabswachtmeister» was replaced by the universal rank designation Stabsfeldwebel. The equivalent rank of the Volksmarine (en: GDR Navy) was the Stabsobermeister of the Volksmarine.

 See also 
Ranks of the National People's Army

References 

 Die Streitkräfte der Republik Österreich, 1918-1968, Heeresgeschichtliches Museum, Militärwissenschaftliches Institut, 1968.

Military ranks of Austria
Austro-Hungarian Army
Military ranks of Germany